The 2017–18 Bowling Green Falcons women's basketball team represents Bowling Green State University during the 2017–18 NCAA Division I women's basketball season. The Falcons, led by sixth year head coach Jennifer Roos, play their home games at the Stroh Center as members of the East Division of the Mid-American Conference. They finished the season 11–19, 3–15 in MAC play to finish in a tie for last place in the East Division. They lost in the first round of the MAC women's tournament to Western Michigan.

On March 8, Jennifer Roos was fired. She finished at Bowling Green with a six year record of 92–97. On April 3, the school hired Robyn Fralick to be the next head coach at Bowling Green.

Roster

Schedule

|-
!colspan=9 style=| Exhibition

|-
!colspan=9 style=| Non-conference regular season

|-
!colspan=9 style=| MAC regular season

|-
!colspan=9 style=| MAC Women's Tournament

See also
2017–18 Bowling Green Falcons men's basketball team

References

2017–18 Mid-American Conference women's basketball season
2017-18
2017 in sports in Ohio
2018 in sports in Ohio